"I Never Figured on This" is a single by Canadian country music artist David Thompson. The song debuted at number 44 on the RPM Country Tracks chart on September 26, 1981. It peaked at number one on December 26, 1981.

Charts

References

1981 singles
David Thompson (singer) songs
1981 songs